Claude Balon (also Ballon, often incorrectly named Jean; 1671–1744) was a French dancer and choreographer. The ballet term ballon is sometimes said to be derived from his name, but Robert Greskovic calls this "dubious". Balon danced under the tutelage of the balletmaster Pierre Beauchamp at the Paris Opera. Marie Sallé is identified as a student of Balon's.

References

French male ballet dancers
French choreographers
French ballet masters
Dancers from Paris
1671 births
1744 deaths
17th-century French people
17th-century ballet dancers
18th-century French ballet dancers
Balon